The 1945 Venezuelan coup d'état took place on 18 October 1945, when the president Isaías Medina Angarita was overthrown by a combination of a military rebellion and a popular movement led by Democratic Action. The coup led to a three-year period of government known as El Trienio Adeco, which saw the first participant presidential elections in Venezuelan history, beginning with the 1946 Venezuelan Constituent Assembly election. The 1947 Venezuelan general election saw Democratic Action formally elected to office (with Rómulo Gallegos as president, replacing interim President Rómulo Betancourt), but it was removed from office shortly after in the 1948 Venezuelan coup d'état.

See also
 History of Venezuela (1948–1958)

References

Venezuela
Coup D'état
Military coups in Venezuela
Conflicts in 1945
October 1945 events in South America
Rómulo Betancourt